Hollywood Vice Squad is a 1986 film directed by Penelope Spheeris with music by Keith Levene of Public Image Ltd. It marked Robin Wright's film debut.

Plot
Pauline Stanton, a mother, travels to Hollywood to find her daughter, Lori, working at the porn industry.

Cast

Reception
The film received mixed reviews and described it as "decent, but dull."

References

External links

1986 films
1980s crime films
American crime films
Films directed by Penelope Spheeris
Films scored by Michael Convertino
Films about pornography
Films about runaways
1980s English-language films
1980s American films